The Kalakad wrinkled frog (Nyctibatrachus vasanthi)) is a species of night frog in the family Nyctibatrachidae endemic to the Western Ghats, India.
Its natural habitats are tropical moist lowland forests.  
It is threatened by habitat loss.

References

Nyctibatrachus
Frogs of India
Endemic fauna of the Western Ghats
Taxonomy articles created by Polbot
Amphibians described in 1997